Scopula nesciaria is a moth of the family Geometridae. It was described by Francis Walker in 1861. It is found in Asia including Sri Lanka, China, the Ryukyu Islands, Taiwan and Indonesia.

Subspecies
Scopula nesciaria nesciaria (Sri Lanka)
Scopula nesciaria absconditaria (Walker, 1861) (China, Taiwan)

References

Moths described in 1861
Moths of Asia
nesciaria
Taxa named by Francis Walker (entomologist)